Ferdinand Justi (2 June 1837 in Marburg, Germany – 17 February 1907 in Marburg) was a German linguist and Orientalist.

He finished his studies of linguistics at the University of Marburg and the University of Göttingen. In 1861 he lived in Marburg, where in 1865 he became associate and in 1869 full professor of comparative linguistics and Germanic philology.

In addition to his academic work, he studied with meticulous precision the life of the Hessian peasants in the last third of the 19th century, especially in the immediate and wider area of Marburg, on which he wrote his observations and described it in countless sketches and watercolors. One of his main themes included buildings, furniture, agricultural implements, and especially costumes, with all its subtleties and accessories.

Works
Handbuch der Zendsprache. Leipzig 1864
Dictionnaire kurde-francaise. Petersburg 1879
Geschichte des alten Persiens. Berlin 1879
Kurdische Grammatik. Sankt Petersburg  1880
Geschichte der orientalischen Völker im Altertum. Berlin 1884
Iranisches Namenbuch. Marburg 1884
Hessisches Trachtenbuch. Marburg 1899 - 1905

Literature

External links
 

1837 births
1907 deaths
German orientalists
Linguists from Germany
Academic staff of the University of Marburg
People from Marburg
German male non-fiction writers